The Villnößer Bach is a stream located in South Tyrol, Italy. Main tributaries are the St. Zenobach (Rio San Zeno) and the Flitzer Bach (Rio Valluzza). The course of the river is entirely within the village of Villnöß, bordering the frazioni (municipal subdivisions) of St. Magdalena (Santa Maddalena) and St. Peter (San Pietro).

External links 
Civic Network of South Tyrol (in German)

Rivers of Italy
Rivers of South Tyrol